Rustemi is a given name and surname. It may refer to:

Arlind Rustemi (born 1986), Albanian footballer
Avni Rustemi (1895–1924), Albanian patriot, militant, teacher, activist and member of the Albanian parliament. He is also known for assassinating Essad Pasha Toptani
Rustemi Kreshnik (born 1984), Albanian-Belgian kickboxer

See also
Carabus rustemi, a species of black coloured ground beetle in the Carabinae subfamily that is endemic to Kazakhstan